The Journal of Hyperbolic Differential Equations was founded in 2004 and carries papers pertaining to nonlinear hyperbolic problems and related mathematical topics, specifically on the theory and numerical analysis of hyperbolic conservation laws and of hyperbolic partial differential equations arising in mathematical physics. This includes topics such as nonlinear hyperbolic systems in continuum physics (for example, hyperbolic models of fluid dynamics, mixed models of transonic flows). The journal is published by World Scientific.

Abstracting and indexing 
The journal is abstracted and indexed in:

 Mathematical Reviews
 Zentralblatt MATH
 Science Citation Index Expanded
 Current Contents/Physical, Chemical and Earth Sciences
 CompuMath Citation Index
 Journal Citation Reports/Science Edition
 ISI Alerting Services
 Inspec

External links 

 JHDE Journal Website

Mathematics journals
Publications established in 2004
English-language journals
World Scientific academic journals
Quarterly journals